Siberia, including the Russian Far East, is a vast region spanning the northern part of the Asian continent, and forming the Asiatic portion of Russia. As a result of the Russian conquest of Siberia (17th to 19th centuries) and of the subsequent population movements during the Soviet era (1917-1991), the modern-day demographics of Siberia is dominated by ethnic Russians (Siberiaks) and other Slavs. However, there remains a slowly increasing number of indigenous groups, accounting for about 5% of the total Siberian population (about 1.6–1.8 million), some of which are closely genetically related to indigenous peoples of the Americas.

History

In Kamchatka, the Itelmens' uprisings against Russian rule in 1706, 1731, and 1741, were crushed. During the first uprising the Itelmen were armed with only stone weapons, but in later uprisings they used gunpowder weapons. The Russian Cossacks faced tougher resistance from the Koryaks, who revolted with bows and guns from 1745 to 1756, and were even forced to give up in their attempts to wipe out the Chukchi in 1729, 1730–31, and 1744–47. After the Russian defeat in 1729 at Chukchi hands, the Russian commander Major Dmitry Pavlutsky was responsible for the Russian war against the Chukchi and the mass slaughters and enslavement of Chukchi women and children in 1730–31, but his cruelty only made the Chukchis fight more fiercely. 

A war against the Chukchis and Koryaks was ordered by Empress Elizabeth in 1742 to totally expel them from their native lands and erase their culture through war. The command was that the natives be "totally extirpated" with Pavlutskiy leading again in this war from 1744 to 1747 in which he led to the Cossacks "with the help of Almighty God and to the good fortune of Her Imperial Highness", to slaughter the Chukchi men and enslave their women and children as booty. However this phase of the war came to an inconclusive end, when the Chukchi forced them to give up by killing Pavlutskiy and decapitating him.

The Russians launched wars and conducted mass slaughters against the Koryaks in 1744 and 1753–54. After the Russians tried to force the natives to convert to Christianity, different native peoples such as the Koryaks, Chukchis, Itelmens, and Yukaghirs all united to drive the Russians out of their land in the 1740s, culminating in the assault on Nizhnekamchatsk fort in 1746. After its annexation by Russia in 1697, around 100,000 of 150,000 Itelmen and Koryaks died due to infectious diseases such as smallpox, mass suicides and the mass slaughters perpetrated by the Cossacks throughout the first decades of Russian rule. 

The genocide by the Russian Cossacks devastated the native peoples of Kamchatka and exterminated much of their population. In addition to committing genocide, the Cossacks also devastated the wildlife by slaughtering massive numbers of animals for fur. Ninety percent of the Kamchadals and half of the Vogules were killed from the 18th to 19th centuries. The rapid genocide of the indigenous population led to entire ethnic groups being entirely wiped out, with around 12 exterminated groups which were named by Nikolai Iadrintsev as of 1882. Much of the slaughter was brought on by the Siberian fur trade.

In the 17th century, indigenous peoples of the Amur region were attacked and colonized by Russians who came to be known as "red-beards". The Russian Cossacks were named luocha (羅剎) or rakshasa by Amur natives, after demons found in Buddhist mythology. The natives of the Amur region feared the invaders as they ruthlessly colonized the Amur tribes, who were tributaries of the Qing dynasty during the Sino–Russian border conflicts. Qing forces and Korean musketeers who were allied with the Qing defeated the Cossacks in 1658, which kept the Russians out of the inner reaches of the Amur region for decades.

The regionalist oblastniki were, in the 19th century, among the Russians in Siberia who acknowledged that the natives were subjected to violence of almost genocidal proportions by the Russian colonization. They claimed that they would rectify the situation with their proposed regionalist policies. The colonizers used massacres, alcoholism and disease to bring the natives under their control. Some small nomadic groups essentially disappeared, and much of the evidence of their obliteration has itself been destroyed, with only a few artifacts documenting their presence remaining in Russian museums and collections.

The Russian colonization of Siberia and conquest of its indigenous peoples has been compared to European colonization in the United States and its natives, with similar negative impacts on the natives and the appropriation of their land.

From 1918 to 1921, there was a violent revolutionary upheaval in Siberia during the Russian Civil War. Russian Cossacks under Captain Grigori Semionov established themselves as warlords by crushing the indigenous peoples who resisted them. The Czechoslovak Legion initially took control of Vladivostok and controlled all of the territory along the Trans-Siberian Railway by September 1918. The Legion later declared its neutrality and was evacuated via Vladivostok.

Today, Kamchatka is largely populated by a Russian majority, although decreasing, with a slowly increasing indigenous population. The Slavic Russians outnumber all of the native peoples in Siberia and its cities except in Tuva and Sakha (where the Tuvans and Yakuts serve as the majority ethnic groups respectively), with the Slavic Russians making up the majority in Buryatia and the Altai Republic, outnumbering the Buryat and Altai natives. 

The Buryats make about 33% of their own Republic, the Altai make up about 37%, and the Chukchi 28%; Evenks, Khanty, Mansi, and Nenets are outnumbered by non-natives by nearly 90% of the population. The Czars and Soviets enacted policies to force natives to change their way of life, while rewarding ethnic Russians with the natives' reindeer herds and wild game they had confiscated. The reindeer herds have been mismanaged to the point of extinction.

Overview 

Siberia is a sparsely populated region. Historically it has been home to a variety of different linguistic groups. According to some estimates, by the beginning of the 17th century, indigenous peoples numbered 160,000. In  the 1897 census, their number was 822,000. The 2021 census recorded 1,620,000 indigenous Siberians.

Some estimates put the population of Siberian Tatars at 200,000.

Ainu people

Ainu languages are spoken on Sakhalin, Hokkaido, the Kurils, and on the Kamchatka Peninsula, as well as in the Amur region. Today, Ainu is nearly extinct, with the last native speakers remaining in Hokkaido and on Kamchatka.

Mongolic peoples

The Buryats number 461,389 in Russia according to the 2010 census, which makes them the second largest ethnic minority group in Siberia. They are mainly concentrated in their homeland, the Buryat Republic, a federal subject of Russia. They are the northernmost major group of the Mongols.

Buryats share many customs with their Mongolian cousins, including nomadic herding and erecting huts for shelter. Today, the majority of Buryats live in and around Ulan Ude, the capital of the republic, although many live more traditionally in the countryside. Their language is called Buryat.

In Zabaykalsky Krai of Russia, in Mongolia and China, there are also the Hamnigans—a Mongolic ethno-linguistic (sub)group as Mongolized Evenks.

Paleosiberian peoples

Four small language families and isolates, not known to have any linguistic relationship to each other, compose the Paleo-Siberian languages:

Chukotko-Kamchatkan
1. The Chukotko-Kamchatkan family, sometimes known as Luoravetlan, includes Chukchi and its close relatives, Koryak, Alutor, and Kerek. Itelmen, also known as Kamchadal, is also distantly related. Chukchi, Koryak and Alutor are spoken in easternmost Siberia by communities numbering in the dozens (Alutor) to thousands (Chukchi). Kerek is now extinct, and Itelmen is now spoken by fewer than 10 people, mostly elderly, on the west coast of the Kamchatka Peninsula.

Nivkh
2. Nivkh is spoken in the lower Amur basin and on the northern half of Sakhalin island. It has a recent modern literature and the Nivkhs have experienced a turbulent history in the last century.

Yeniseian
3. Ket is the last survivor of the Yeniseian family along the middle of the Yenisei River and its tributaries. It has recently been claimed  to be related to the Na-Dene languages of North America, though this hypothesis has met with mixed reviews among historical linguists. In the past, attempts have been made to relate it to Sino-Tibetan, North Caucasian, and Burushaski.

Yukaghir
4. Yukaghir is spoken in two mutually unintelligible varieties in the lower Kolyma and Indigirka valleys. Other languages, including Chuvantsy, spoken further inland and further east, are now extinct. Yukaghir is held by some to be related to the Uralic languages.

Tungusic peoples

The Evenks live in the Evenk Autonomous Okrug of Russia.

The Udege, Ulchs, Evens, and Nanai (also known as Hezhen) are also indigenous peoples of Siberia, and are known to share genetic affinity to indigenous peoples of the Americas.

Turkic peoples

The Siberian Turks include the following ethnic groups:
 Altaians
 Chelkans
 Telengits
 Tubalars
 Chulyms
 Dolgans
 Khakas
 Kumandins
 Shors
 Siberian Tatars
 Baraba Tatars
 Soyots
 Teleuts
 Tofalar
 Tuvans
 Tozhu Tuvans
 Yakuts

Uralic peoples

Ugrians 

The Khanty (obsolete: Ostyaks) and Mansi (obsolete: Voguls) live in Khanty–Mansi Autonomous Okrug, a region historically known as "Yugra" in Russia. By 2013, oil and gas companies had already devastated much of the Khanty tribes' lands. In 2014 the Khanty-Mansi regional parliament continued to weaken legislation that had previously protected Khanty and Mansi communities. Tribes' permission was required before oil and gas companies could enter their land.

Samoyeds 

Samoyedic peoples include:
Northern Samoyedic peoples
Nenets
Enets
Nganasan
Southern Samoyedic peoples
Selkup
Kamasins or Kamas
Mator or Motor (now extinct as a distinct ethnic group)
Koibal (now extinct as a distinct ethnic group)

Yukaghir group
Yukaghir is spoken in two mutually unintelligible varieties in the lower Kolyma and Indigirka valleys. Other languages, including Chuvantsy, spoken further inland and further east, are now extinct. Yukaghir is held by some to be related to the Uralic languages in the Uralic–Yukaghir family.

The Yukaghirs (self-designation: одул odul, деткиль detkil) are people in East Siberia, living in the basin of the Kolyma River. The Tundra Yukaghirs live in the Lower Kolyma region in the Sakha Republic; the Taiga Yukaghirs in the Upper Kolyma region in the Sakha Republic and in Srednekansky District of Magadan Oblast. By the time of Russian colonization in the 17th century, the Yukaghir tribal groups (Chuvans, Khodyns, Anauls, etc.) occupied territories from the Lena River to the mouth of the Anadyr River. 

The number of the Yukaghirs decreased between the 17th and 19th centuries due to epidemics, internecine wars and Tsarist colonial policy. Some of the Yukaghirs have assimilated with the Yakuts, Evens, and Russians.  Currently Yukaghirs live in the Sakha Republic and the Chukotka Autonomous Okrug of the Russian Federation. In the 2002 Census, their total number was 1,509 people, up from 1,112 in the 1989 Census.

Genetic relationships and links to indigenous peoples of the Americas

Indigenous Siberians are generally characterized by two Siberia-specific ancestral lineages. These are "Ancient North Siberians", which diverged from other populations around 38-40kya, and "Neo-Siberians", which diverged from other populations around 15-25kya ago. These two groups contributed in varying degrees to all indigenous populations of Siberia and Native Americans, but were later partially replaced by further expansions from Northeast Asian populations. Indigenous Siberians may also derive ancestry from a deep Eurasian lineage samplified by the Ust'-Ishim man, previously suggested to have not contributed to any modern human population. Overall, Indigenous Siberians and other Northern Asians form a distinct cluster within the wider Eurasian genetic diversity.

Early Native Americans are thought to have crossed into the Americas across the Beringia land bridge between 40,000 and 13,000 years ago from modern day Siberia. Modern Indigenous Siberians are closely related to the Indigenous peoples of the Americas, with whom they share a common origin. The ancestor of Paleo-Siberians and Native Americans originated from an prehistoric merger of an Ancient Asian lineage ultimately coming from Mainland Southeast Asia or Southern China about 36,000 years ago, and from a different Upper-Paleolithic Siberian population, known as Ancient North Eurasians, which also contributed varying degrees of ancestry towards modern Europeans, specifically the Eastern Hunter-Gatherers, giving rise to both Paleosiberian peoples and Ancient Native Americans, which later migrated towards the Beringian region, became isolated from other populations, and subsequently populated the Americas. 

Genetic analyses found that Paleo-Siberians are most closely related to Native Americans, followed by East Asians, but also show affinity towards many modern Europeans. Paleo-Siberians and Native Americans nevertheless are significantly differentiated from both East Asians and European populations, forming their own cluster of diversity within the broader human populations. Since around 15kya, another distinct population has formed out of the genetic diversity of indigenous Siberians in Northeastern Siberia, which is known as 'Neo-Siberians' and subsequently contributed ancestry to Indigenous groups in Western Siberia as well as to Native Americans, associated with the expansion of Paleo-Eskimo, and Eskimo-Aleut groups.

Analysis of genetic markers has also been used to link the two groups of indigenous peoples. Studies focused on looking at markers on the Y chromosome, which is always inherited by sons from their fathers. Haplogroup Q is a unique mutation shared among most indigenous peoples of the Americas, less among Siberian populations. Studies have found that 93.8% of Siberia's Ket people and 66.4% of Siberia's Selkup people possess the mutation, while it is largely absent from other populations in Eastern Asia or Europe. 

The principal-component analysis suggests a close genetic relatedness between some North American Amerindians (the Chipewyan [Dënesųłı̨ne] and the Cheyenne) and certain populations of central/southern Siberia (particularly the Kets, Yakuts, Selkups, and Altaians), at the resolution of major Y-chromosome haplogroups. This pattern agrees with the distribution of mtDNA haplogroup X, which is found in North America, is absent from eastern Siberia, but is present in the Altaians of southern central Siberia.

Culture and customs 

Customs and beliefs vary greatly among different tribes.

The Chukchi wore laminar armour of hardened leather reinforced by wood and bones.

Kutkh (also Kutkha, Kootkha, Kutq Kutcha and other variants, Russian: Кутх), is a raven spirit traditionally revered by the Chukchi and other Siberian tribal groups. He is said to be very powerful.

Toko'yoto or the "Crab" was the Chukchi god of the sea.

Nu'tenut is the chief god of the Chukchi.

The Chukchi also  respect reindeer in both mortal and holy life. They have several rituals involving them.

The Supreme Deity of the Yukaghirs is called Pon, which means "Something".
He is described as very powerful.

Literature
Rubcova, E.S.: Materials on the Language and Folklore of the Eskimoes, Vol. I, Chaplino Dialect. Academy of Sciences of the USSR, Moskva * Leningrad, 1954

Barüske, Heinz: Eskimo Märchen. Eugen Diederichs Verlag, Düsseldorf and Köln, 1969.
Merkur, Daniel: Becoming Half Hidden / Shamanism and Initiation Among the Inuit. Acta Universitatis Stockholmiensis / Stockholm Studies in Comparative Religion. Almqvist & Wiksell, Stockholm, 1985.
Kleivan, I. and Sonne, B.: Eskimos / Greenland and Canada. (Series: Iconography of religions, section VIII /Arctic Peoples/, fascicle 2). Institute of Religious Iconography • State University Groningen. E.J. Brill, Leiden (The Netherland), 1985. .

See also
 
Ancient Beringian, Siberian indigenous people.
History of Siberia
Demographics of Siberia
First All Union Census of the Soviet Union
Indigenous people
List of ethnic groups
Y-DNA haplogroups in populations of Central and North Asia
Pomors
Kola Norwegians
Uralic languages
Shamanism in Siberia
List of indigenous peoples of Russia
List of small-numbered indigenous peoples of Russia
Small-numbered indigenous peoples of Extreme North
Circumpolar peoples
Indigenous peoples of the Subarctic

Citations

References

External links

 Russian Association of Indigenous Peoples of the North
 
 
 Endangered Uralic Peoples
 Minority languages of Russia on the Net 
 The Red Book of the peoples of the Russian Empire
 Survival International page on the Siberian Tribes
 L'auravetl'an Indigenous Information Network by Indigenous Peoples of Russia
  В погоне за малыми, an article about treatment of minorities in the Russian Empire, Kommersant-Money, October 25, 2005
 Mapping Indigenous Siberia: Spatial Changes and Ethnic Realities, 1900–2010. Ivan Sablin & Maria Savelyeva

Ethnic groups in Siberia
 Russian Northern indigenous peoples
North Asia
Northeast Asia
Russian Far East